Daniel Boisserie (born 8 June 1946) was a member of the National Assembly of France. He represented the 2nd constituency of the Haute-Vienne department from 1997 to 2012,  and was a member of the Socialiste, radical, citoyen et divers gauche.

References

1946 births
Living people
Socialist Party (France) politicians
Deputies of the 12th National Assembly of the French Fifth Republic
Deputies of the 13th National Assembly of the French Fifth Republic
Deputies of the 14th National Assembly of the French Fifth Republic

Members of Parliament for Haute-Vienne